Itzik Manger (30 May 1901, Czernowitz, then Austrian-Hungarian Empire – 21 February 1969, Gedera, Israel) was a prominent Yiddish poet and playwright, a self-proclaimed folk bard, visionary, and 'master tailor' of the written word. A Jew from Bucovina, Manger lived in Romania, Poland, France, England, the US (New York), Canada (Montreal) and finally Israel.

Early life
Manger was born to a Jewish family in Czernowitz, Austria-Hungary (later Cernăuți, Romania and now Chernivtsi, Ukraine) in 1901. His father, Hillel Manger, was a skilled tailor in love with literature, which he referred to as 'literatoyreh' (a portmanteau of the Yiddish words literatura and Toyreh). As a teenager, Manger attended the Kaiserlich-Königliches III. Staatsgymnasium in Czernowitz, where he studied German literature until he was expelled for pranks and bad behaviour. He exchanged this traditional education for the backstage atmosphere of the Yiddish theatre.

Young poet 
In 1921, Manger began publishing his early poems and ballads in several new literary journals founded in the aftermath of World War I. Soon afterwards, he settled in Bucharest and wrote for the local Yiddish newspapers while giving occasional lectures on Spanish, Romanian, and Gypsy folklore.

In 1927, Manger came to Warsaw, the spiritual and intellectual center of Ashkenazi Jewry and "the most inspiring city in Poland." Manger lived in the capital of the Yiddish cultural world for the next decade, which became the most productive years of his entire career. In 1929, Manger published his first book of poetry, Shtern afn dakh (Stars on the Roof), in Warsaw to critical acclaim. By the following year, Manger was so well known that he was admitted to the  Yiddish P.E.N. club, along with Isaac Bashevis, Israel Rabon, and Joseph Papiernikov.

Literary success

Between 1929 and 1938, Manger took the Warsaw literary world by storm. He gave frequent readings of his own poetry at the Writers' Club, was interviewed by all the major Warsaw Yiddish papers, published articles in the prestigious journal  (Literary Pages), issued his own literary journal called Chosen Words filled with his poetry, fiction, and artistic manifestos. At the same time, Manger continued to publish his own works, including a series of modernist poems inspired by the Oral Torah (Itzik's Midrash, 1935), a dramatic rewriting of the Purim story from the Book of Esther (Songs of the Megillah, 1936), a loose adaptation of Abraham Goldfaden's The Witch of Botoşani (Hotzmakh's Shpiel, 1937), a series of fictional vignettes on the history of Yiddish literature (Familiar Portraits, 1938), and three more volumes of poetry (Lantern in the Wind, 1933; Velvl Zbarzher Writes Letters to Malkele the Beautiful, 1937; and Twilight in the Mirror, 1937).

Working with Biblical themes
Manger's Itzik's Midrash and Songs of the Megillah deserve special mention, as they represent his first attempts to re-write old, familiar material through a modernist lens. In Itzik's Midrash, Manger presents a modern commentary on the classic Bible stories by anachronistically placing his characters in contemporary Eastern Europe. Manger's playful attitude towards the original text is self-evident; in the introduction he writes, "As I wrote this book, the rogue's cap of the Yiddish Purim play hovered always before my eyes." Inspired by the Purimshpiel genre, which used a traditional story to mock the norms and expectations of Jewish religious life in previous centuries, Manger's Midrash radically revises traditional portrayals of Biblical characters by requiring them to justify their actions according to modern norms and values. Traditionally valued characters such as Abraham and Sarah are harshly critiqued, while under-represented characters like Hagar and Ishmael are given a voice.

In Songs of the Megillah, Manger uses a similar technique to politicise and de-sacralise the Biblical text read aloud on Purim. Once again, Manger's introduction classifies the book as "a kind of mischief-making on the model of Purim players in every age." Like Itzik's Midrash, Songs of the Megillah is a modern, radical retelling of the story of Esther set in contemporary Eastern Europe. Manger even introduces a new character into the narrative: Fastrigosso, Esther's jilted lover and a member of the Needles and Thread Tailors' Union, who conspires to assassinate King Ahashverosh to win back Esther's affections. Combined with his 1937 play Hotzmakh's Shpiel, these three revival texts secured Manger his international reputation as "the master recloaker of the oldest and the newest literary traditions."

From Warsaw to Tel Aviv
Manger never acquired Polish citizenship and was forced to leave the country in the light of legal difficulties. Manger decided to leave for Paris in 1938, an exile from his creative homeland. However, Paris was not safe for long. In 1940, Manger fled to Marseilles, Tunis, Liverpool, and finally London, where he became a British citizen and remained unhappily for the next eleven years. Disillusioned and unproductive, Manger immigrated to Israel in 1958, where he remained until his death in Gedera in 1969.

Acclaim in Israel and elsewhere
Unlike most other exiled Yiddish writers, Manger was able to achieve significant success in Israeli literary and theatrical circles. In 1965, Dov Seltzer directed a highly popular production of Manger's Songs of the Megillah, breaking the Israeli taboo on Yiddish theatre. Songs of the Megillah was a great success, setting a new record in Israeli theatre with its more than 400 performances. Prominent members of Israeli society, including politicians Levi Eshkol, Golda Meir, and Teddy Kollek, made highly publicised appearances at the performances. When he died in 1969, Manger was mourned as an Israeli national poet.

Romanian Jewish playwright Israil Bercovici adapted a collection of Manger's poems into a two-act stage piece, Mangheriada, which premiered 6 April 1968 at the Romanian State Jewish Theater in Bucharest.

Manger's poem "Oyfn veg shteyt a boym" ("On the Road Stands a Tree") has been set to music and has entered the repertoire of Yiddish song, for example as "Oif'n Weg Steht A Boim" it was a 1951 hit for Leo Fuld.

Hertz Grosbard recited many of his works in so called "word concerts".

Itzik Manger Prize

Shortly before his death, the Itzik Manger Prize for outstanding Yiddish writing was established. The inaugural prize was given to Manger himself at a banquet on 31 October 1968. The banquet was attended by Golda Meir, then the prime minister of Israel, and by Zalman Shazar, then president. Subsequently, the prize was awarded annually until about 2000.

Books
  - lit.: Itzik Manger, Dark Gold, Poems, Yiddish and German, compiled, translated and with an afterword by Efrat Gal-Ed. Jüdischer Verlag im Suhrkamp Verlag, 2004. Second edition 2016, with additional, previously unpublished poems. With transliteration (romanisation) and CD ("Itzik Manger reading Itzik Manger", recordings from 1966).

References

External links
 

1901 births
1969 deaths
Yiddish-language poets
20th-century Romanian poets
 Writers from Chernivtsi
Israeli poets
Israeli people of Romanian-Jewish descent
Bukovina Jews
Yiddish-language playwrights
20th-century British poets
British male dramatists and playwrights
Romanian male poets
20th-century British male writers
Burials at Nahalat Yitzhak Cemetery